Austin A. Cassar-Torreggiani (born 23 July 1915, date of death unknown) was a Maltese sprinter. He competed in the men's 100 metres at the 1936 Summer Olympics.

References

External links
 

1915 births
Year of death missing
Athletes (track and field) at the 1936 Summer Olympics
Maltese male sprinters
Olympic athletes of Malta
Place of birth missing